Podenii Noi is a commune in Prahova County, Muntenia, Romania. It is composed of ten villages: Ghiocel, Mehedința, Nevesteasca, Podenii Noi, Podu lui Galben, Popești, Rahova, Sălcioara, Sfăcăru and Valea Dulce.

References

Communes in Prahova County
Localities in Muntenia